Quincy Township is a township in Greenwood County, Kansas, USA.  As of the 2000 census, its population was 163.

Geography
According to the USGS, it contains two cemeteries: Pleasant Valley and Quincy.

The streams of Bachelor Creek, Brazil Creek, Dry Creek and West Creek run through this township.

References
 USGS Geographic Names Information System (GNIS)

External links
 US-Counties.com
 City-Data.com

Townships in Greenwood County, Kansas
Townships in Kansas